A lithopedion (also spelled lithopaedion or lithopædion; from  "stone" and  "small child, infant"), or stone baby, is a rare phenomenon which occurs most commonly when a fetus dies during an abdominal pregnancy, is too large to be reabsorbed by the body, and calcifies on the outside as part of a foreign body reaction, shielding the mother's body from the dead tissue of the fetus and preventing infection.

Lithopedia may occur from 14 weeks gestation to full term. It is not unusual for a stone baby to remain undiagnosed for decades and to be found well after natural menopause; diagnosis often happens when the patient is examined for other conditions that require being subjected to an X-ray study. A review of 128 cases by T.S.P. Tien found that the mean age of women with lithopedia was 55 years at the time of diagnosis, with the oldest being one-hundred years old. The lithopedion was carried for an average of 22 years, and in several cases, the women became pregnant a second time and gave birth to children without incident. Nine of the reviewed cases had carried lithopedia for over 50 years before diagnosis.

According to one report there are only 300 known cases of lithopedia recorded over 400 years of medical literature. While the chance of abdominal pregnancy is one in 11,000 pregnancies, only between 1.5 and 1.8 percent of these abdominal pregnancies may develop into lithopedia.

History

The earliest known lithopedion was found in an archaeological excavation at Bering Sinkhole, on the Edwards Plateau in Kerr County, Texas, and dated to 1100 BC. Another early example was found in a Gallo-Roman archaeological site in Costebelle, southern France, dating to the 4th century.

The condition was first described in a treatise by the Spanish Muslim physician Abū al-Qāsim (Abulcasis) in the 10th century. By the mid-18th century, a number of cases had been documented in humans, sheep and hares in France and Germany. In a speech before the French Académie Royale des Sciences in 1748, surgeon Sauveur François Morand used lithopedia both as evidence of the common nature of fetal development in viviparous and oviparous animals, and as an argument in favor of caesarean section.

An archeological team did a "differential diagnosis of a calcified cyst found in an 18th century female burial site at St. Nicholas Church cemetery" in Czechia and determined the mass was likely either a case of lithopedion or fetus in fetu. 

In 1880, German physician Friedrich Küchenmeister reviewed 47 cases of lithopedia from the medical literature and distinguished three subgroups: Lithokelyphos ("Stone Sheath"), where calcification occurs on the placental membrane and not the fetus; Lithotecnon ("Stone Child") or "true" lithopedion, where the fetus itself is calcified after entering the abdominal cavity, following the rupture of the placental and ovarian membranes; and Lithokelyphopedion ("Stone Sheath [and] Child"), where both fetus and sac are calcified. Lithopedia can originate both as tubal and ovarian pregnancies, although tubal pregnancy cases are more common.

Reported cases

Before 1900

* After death of the patient.

After 1900

See also
 Fetus in fetu

Notes

Further reading

External links
 What is the process that creates a stone baby? (MadSci Network)
 Ernst Bjerke: A pregnancy of 10-years duration
 Nigerianschoolsonline-Lithopedion

Pregnancy with abortive outcome
Vertebrate developmental biology